Justine Henin-Hardenne defeated Kim Clijsters in the final, 7–5, 6–1 to win the women's singles tennis title at the 2003 US Open. She lost only one set during the tournament.

Serena Williams was the reigning champion, but did not participate due to injury. Defending finalist and her sister Venus Williams also withdrew before the tournament due to injury, marking the first time in the Open Era that neither of the reigning US Open finalists returned. This was also the only major between the 1997 Australian Open and the 2011 French Open (a span of 56 events) where neither of the Williams sisters competed.

This marked the first US Open main draw appearance of future champion Flavia Pennetta; she lost to Svetlana Kuznetsova in the first round.

Seeds

Qualifying

Draw

Finals

Top half

Section 1

Section 2

Section 3

Section 4

Bottom half

Section 5

Section 6

Section 7

Section 8

References

External links
2003 US Open – Women's draws and results at the International Tennis Federation

Women's Singles
US Open (tennis) by year – Women's singles
2003 in women's tennis
2003 in American women's sports